Austria has competed at all of the modern Olympic Games, with the exception of the 1920 Summer Olympics, from which it was barred because of its involvement with the Central Powers in World War I.

Austria has won more medals in alpine skiing than any other nation in the world.

The National Olympic Committee for Austria is the Austrian Olympic Committee, and was created in 1908 and recognized in 1912.

Hosted Games 
Innsbruck is the only city in Austria that has hosted the games. It has done so on two occasions, both in winter.

Medal tables 

*Red border colour indicates hosted tournaments.

Medals by Summer Games

Medals by Winter Games

Medals by summer sport

Medals by winter sport

List of medalists

Summer Olympics

Winter Olympics

Summary by sport

Aquatics

Swimming

Austria first competed in swimming at the inaugural 1896 Games, with two swimmers competing in the three international events winning a gold and a silver medal. That gold remains (as of the 2016 Games) the only swimming victory for Austria, though the nation has added 5 silvers and 5 bronzes since.

Athletics

Austria first competed in athletics in 1900, with two athletes winning no medals.

Cycling

Austria first competed in cycling in 1896, with Adolf Schmal winning a gold medal and two bronzes (retroactively, as the award system was different then). Austria didn't win another medal in cycling until 2021, when Anna Kiesenhofer won gold in the women's road race.

Equestrian

Austria had two riders at the first equestrian events in 1900, competing in all five events and winning no medals. Hugo Simon finished fourth in individual jumping twice—24 years apart, in 1972 and 1996.

Fencing

Austria had a single sabreur at the 1896 Games, finishing fourth. The nation's first medals in the sport came in 1900, with bronze medals in the men's sabre and men's masters sabre.

Sailing

See also
 List of flag bearers for Austria at the Olympics
 :Category:Olympic competitors for Austria
 Austria at the Paralympics

External links